Jorge Donn (25 February 1947 in Ciudad Jardin, Buenos Aires – 30 November 1992 in Lausanne, Switzerland), was an Argentine internationally known ballet dancer. He was best known for his work with Maurice Béjart's Ballet of the 20th Century. He died of AIDS on 30 November 1992 in Lausanne, Switzerland.

Repertoire
 Maurice Béjart
 1964: Ninth Symphony by Beethoven (1967?) 
 1966: Webern Opus V, Roméo et Juliette
 1967: la Messe pour le temps présent 
 1968: Bhakti
 1970: Serait-ce la mort?, Firebird, Sonate N°5  
 1971: The Rite of Spring, Songs of a Wayfarer, Nijinsky, Clown of God 
 1972: Symphony for a Lonely Man
 1973: Sonate à trois, Golestan ou le jardin des roses
 1974: The Triumphs of Petrarch, Ce que l'amour me dit
 1975: Notre Faust 
 1976: Le Molière imaginaire
 1977: Héliogabale, Petrouchka
 1978: Gaîte parisienne, Ce que la mort me dit, Leda (with Maya Plisetskaya)
 1979: Boléro by Ravel (first male performer), Mephisto Waltz  
 1980: Eros Thanatos
 1981: Adagietto by Mahler, Light  
 1982: Vienna, Vienna, Only You
 1983: Messe pour le temps futur
 1984: Dionysos  
 1985: Le concours  
 1986: Malraux ou la métamorphose des dieux 
 1987: Souvenir de Leningrad, ... and Waltz  
 1988: Dybbuk, A force de partir, je suis resté chez moi

 George Balanchine
 1977: Vienna Waltzes, Bugaku

Filmography
1975: Je suis né à Venise by Maurice Béjart — as Jorge / The Sun
1978: Flesh Color by François Weyergans — as Ramón
1981: Les Uns et les Autres by Claude Lelouch — as Boris Itovitch / Sergei Itovitch
1990: There Were Days... and Moons by Claude Lelouch — as dancer (uncredited)

References

External links
 

 Facebook Page
 Unofficial Site

Argentine male ballet dancers
People from Morón Partido
1947 births
1992 deaths
AIDS-related deaths in Switzerland
Gay dancers
Argentine gay actors
20th-century Argentine LGBT people